Patrick Jacques Roy (born October 5, 1965) is a Canadian former professional ice hockey goaltender and executive, who serves as the head coach for the Quebec Remparts of the Quebec Major Junior Hockey League (QMJHL). In 2017, Roy was named one of the 100 Greatest NHL Players in history.

Nicknamed "Saint Patrick," Roy split his playing career in the National Hockey League (NHL) between the Montreal Canadiens, with whom he played for 11 years, and the Colorado Avalanche, with whom he played for eight years. Roy won four Stanley Cups during his career, two with each franchise. 

In 2004, Roy was selected as the greatest goaltender in NHL history by a panel of 41 writers, coupled with a simultaneous fan poll. On November 13, 2006, Roy was inducted into the Hockey Hall of Fame. He is the only player in NHL history to win the Conn Smythe Trophy (the award given to the Most Valuable Player in the Stanley Cup playoffs) three times, the only one to do so in three different decades (1980s, 1990s, and 2000s), and the only one to do so for two teams. Roy's number 33 jersey is retired by both the Canadiens and Avalanche.

Roy is widely credited with popularizing the butterfly style of goaltending, which has since become the dominant style of goaltending around the world. He is currently serving as the general manager and head coach of the Quebec Remparts of the Quebec Major Junior Hockey League (QMJHL).

Early life
Roy was born in Quebec City but grew up in Cap-Rouge, Quebec. His parents are Barbara (Miller) and Michel Roy, and he has a younger brother, Stéphane. Roy became interested in being an ice hockey goalie when he was seven years old. He played in the 1977 and 1978 Quebec International Pee-Wee Hockey Tournaments on a minor ice hockey team from Quebec City, which included his brother in 1978. After playing for the local Sainte-Foy Gouverneurs, he played for the Granby Bisons of the QMJHL(Quebec Major Junior Hockey League). He then began his professional career with the Sherbrooke Canadiens of the American Hockey League (AHL).

NHL career

Montreal Canadiens (1984–95)
Roy was drafted in the third round, 51st overall, in the 1984 NHL Entry Draft by the Montreal Canadiens, a team he disliked, being a fan of the rival Quebec Nordiques. His grandmother Anna Peacock was a big Canadiens fan, but died before seeing her grandson being drafted. Roy kept playing for the Granby Bisons of the Quebec Major Junior Hockey League (QMJHL) before being called up by the Canadiens. Despite the thoughts that he was not going to play for the team, on February 23, 1985, he made his NHL debut when he replaced the Canadiens' starting goaltender, Doug Soetaert, in the game's third period. Roy played for 20 minutes and earned his first NHL win without allowing a goal. After the game, he was reassigned to the Sherbrooke Canadiens of the AHL. Despite starting as a backup, Roy replaced Greg Moffett after he had equipment troubles during a game.  He earned a win, became the starting goaltender for the playoffs and led the team to a Calder Cup championship with ten wins in 13 games.

In the following season, Roy started playing regularly for the Canadiens and took over the starting goaltender's job when incumbent Steve Penney was injured in January. He played 47 games during the regular season and won the starting job for the Stanley Cup playoffs, where he emerged as a star, leading his team to an unexpected Stanley Cup title and winning the Conn Smythe Trophy for the Most Valuable Player in the playoffs. As a 20-year-old, he became the youngest Conn Smythe winner ever and was chosen for the NHL All-Rookie Team.

Nicknamed St. Patrick after the victory, Roy continued playing for the Canadiens, who won the Adams Division in 1987–88 and in 1988–89, when they lost to the Calgary Flames in the Stanley Cup Finals. Roy, together with Brian Hayward, won the William M. Jennings Trophy in 1987, 1988, and 1989, as the Canadiens regularly allowed the fewest goals against. In 1989 and 1990, he won the Vezina Trophy for best goaltender in the NHL and was voted for the NHL first All-Star team. In 1991–92, the Canadiens won the Adams Division again, with Roy having a very successful individual year, winning the William M. Jennings Trophy, Vezina Trophy and being selected for the NHL first All-Star team. Despite the successful regular season, the Canadiens were swept in the second round by the Boston Bruins, who stopped their playoff run for the fourth time in five years.

In the 1992–93 season, the Canadiens fell from first overall in March to finish the regular season third in their division behind title winner Boston Bruins and a resurgent second-place Quebec Nordiques. During the first round of the 1993 playoffs against the archrival Nordiques, Roy was in a goaltending duel against Ron Hextall; Hextall was also a Vezina and Conn Smythe winner with his previous team, the Philadelphia Flyers, when they had several ill-tempered post-season encounters with Roy's Canadiens in the 1980s. The Canadiens lost the first two games of the series with Roy letting in soft goals, and a newspaper in Roy's hometown district suggested that he be traded with the headline "NORDIQUES WIN GAME, BATTLE OF GOALIES," while the subhead added (Quebec goalie Ron) "HEXTALL GETS BETTER OF ROY." Nordiques Goaltending Coach Dan Bouchard also proclaimed that his team had "solved Roy." These comments seemed to fire up Roy, who responded by winning the next four games against the Nordiques (Roy was replaced for part of Game Five by backup André Racicot after being struck by a puck in the collarbone), sweeping the Buffalo Sabres in the next round and winning the first three against the New York Islanders to tie the record of an 11-game playoff winning streak. Roy also set a record with ten straight playoff overtime wins – two against Quebec, three against Buffalo, two against the New York Islanders (where he denied Benoît Hogue and Pierre Turgeon on breakaways during overtime) and three against the Los Angeles Kings in the Stanley Cup Finals. Roy had led his team, which did not have a player that finished in the top twenty regular-season scoring, to the Stanley Cup championship and was named the Conn Smythe Trophy winner.

In 1994, the Canadiens were the defending champions but they were knocked out in the first round by the Boston Bruins. Nonetheless, that seven-game series was notable in the eyes of Montreal fans as Roy came down with appendicitis and missed Game 3. He convinced doctors to let him return for Game 4 and led the Canadiens to a 5–2 victory, stopping 39 shots. Roy was a finalist for the Vezina Trophy, finishing third in voting behind winner Dominik Hašek and runner-up John Vanbiesbrouck.

Trade to Colorado
Four games into the 1995–96 season, Mario Tremblay was hired as Montreal's new head coach, replacing Jacques Demers who had been fired. Roy and Tremblay, who had roomed together while teammates, had a notably strained relationship, with Tremblay regularly mocking Roy's English-speaking abilities. Roy was a frequent target of Tremblay during the latter's sports radio career. The two had almost come to blows in two incidents in 1995, one at a Long Island coffee shop before Tremblay was announced as a coach and after Tremblay allegedly fired a shot at Roy's throat during practice.

On December 2, 1995, in his 22nd game (and the team's 24th) of the 1995–96 season, Roy was in net against the Detroit Red Wings during Montreal's worst home game in franchise history, an 11–1 loss. Roy allowed nine goals on 26 shots, which was highly unusual, as star goalies are generally taken out of the game quickly on off-nights. During the second period, the crowd provided mock applause after Roy made an easy save, prompting him to sarcastically raise his arms in mock celebration. Tremblay finally pulled Roy in the middle of the second period in favour of Pat Jablonski.

During Molson Breweries' tenure as owner of the team, the rows immediately behind the Canadiens' bench were reserved for top Canadiens and Molson executives. Since these seats were not available to the public, the standard glass partitions that separate hockey spectators from the team benches were not installed behind the home bench of the Forum. Because of this unusual arrangement, an enraged Roy had no time to regain his composure before approaching the team's top brass who were in attendance and in their usual seats. Upon reaching the bench, Roy immediately stormed past his coach and told Canadiens President Ronald Corey "It's my last game in Montreal." The next day, Roy was suspended by the Canadiens.

At the time, Roy told the media that despite allowing five goals on 17 shots in the first, Tremblay kept him in net in order to humiliate him. In later interviews, Roy cited a general distaste with what he thought was a loosening of standards with the team.

Four days after the incident, the Canadiens traded Roy and captain Mike Keane to the Colorado Avalanche in exchange for Jocelyn Thibault, Martin Ručinský and Andrei Kovalenko. The return for Roy was seen as uneven at the time it was made, and eventually became known as one of the most one-sided deals in NHL history. Canadiens General Manager Réjean Houle at the time had been GM for only 40 days and faced criticism for making the trade instead of trying to resolve the tension between Roy and Tremblay.

Colorado Avalanche (1996–2003)
In the 1995–96 season, after his mid-season trade from the Canadiens, Roy helped the Avalanche win their first Stanley Cup in their first season after moving from Quebec. He was a runner-up for the Vezina Trophy to Jim Carey.

In the 1996 Western Conference Semi-finals against the Chicago Blackhawks, Jeremy Roenick was stopped by Roy on a breakaway during overtime in Game 4, while apparently being hauled down by Avalanche defenceman Sandis Ozolinsh. The referee did not call for a penalty shot on the play and the Avalanche won in triple overtime on Joe Sakic's game-winning goal. Two days prior, Roenick had scored on an unchallenged breakaway to tie the game and send it to overtime, and the Blackhawks ended up winning Game 3. After Game 4, Roenick told the media, "It should have been a penalty shot, there's no doubt about it. I like Patrick's quote that he would've stopped me. I'd just want to know where he was in Game 3, probably getting his jock out of the rafters in the United Center maybe." Roy retorted with: "I can't really hear what Jeremy says, because I've got my two Stanley Cup rings plugging my ears." Roy and the Avalanche beat the Blackhawks in six games and went on to win the Stanley Cup.

Roy was a large part of the Avalanche–Red Wings rivalry, which also involved players Adam Foote and Brendan Shanahan, among others. The Avalanche and Red Wings met in the playoffs five times from 1996 to 2002, with the Avs winning in 1996, 1999, and 2000. The heated competition between teams is linked to the 11–1 Montreal loss to Detroit that precipitated Roy's mid-season trade to Colorado in December 1995, and in that season's 1996 Conference Finals Roy helped his new team eliminate first-place Detroit. During the Avalanche–Red Wings brawl in 1997, he fought Wings' goaltender Mike Vernon. The next season, he fought another Red Wings goaltender, Chris Osgood. In what would be Roy's final playoff meeting with Detroit, he was pulled after allowing six goals in Game 7 of the 2002 Western Conference Finals, a game Detroit won 7–0 to advance to the Stanley Cup Finals.

In 2000–01, Roy's Avalanche won the Presidents' Trophy for the best regular-season record. In the playoffs, his team advanced to the Finals, where they faced the defending champion New Jersey Devils, who were backstopped by Martin Brodeur, a star netminder who as a youngster had idolized Roy. In Game 4, while playing the puck behind his own net, Roy could not make a clearing pass, allowing the Devils to score into an empty net to tie the game. Roy had his worst game of the Finals in a 4–1 loss during Game 5, which gave the Devils a 3–2 series lead, but rebounded in Game 6 by stopping 24 shots for his then-record 19th career playoff shutout in a 4–0 victory. The Avalanche jumped to a three-goal lead in Game 7 before conceding one consolation goal to win their second Stanley Cup. Roy was named playoff MVP for the third time in his career, an NHL record. Roy has said that he and his teammates had wanted to win it for Ray Bourque, who finally won his first Cup after 22 seasons in the NHL; Bourque who had previously played 21 seasons with the Boston Bruins had numerous playoff encounters against Roy when he was with the Canadiens.

Roy's final game was played against the Minnesota Wild on April 22, 2003, in a Game 7 overtime loss in the first round of the 2003 playoffs.

Patrick Roy announced his retirement on May 28, 2003.

International play
Roy was selected as Team Canada's starting goalie for the 1998 Winter Olympics in Nagano, Japan. Roy played all six games, but Canada failed to win a medal after a shootout loss to Dominik Hašek and the Czech Republic in the semi-final. Roy and Hašek both had save percentages above .950 entering into the game, and regulation ended in a 1–1 tie. After a scoreless overtime, the Czechs beat Canada 1–0 in the tiebreaker shootout. After the loss, their first of the tournament, the Canadians could not regain momentum for the bronze medal game, and subsequently lost 3–2 to Finland, denying Roy his only chance at an Olympic medal. Roy had a 4–2 record with one shutout while averaging 1.46 goals against per game and stopping .935 percent of total shots faced.

Roy declined the opportunity to play for Canada at the 2002 Winter Olympics in Salt Lake City, Utah, before the team's selection took place.

Post retirement
After retiring from the NHL, Roy joined the Quebec Remparts of the QMJHL as vice-president of hockey operations; he also became the owner and general manager, and on September 29, 2005, he was named head coach of the team.

On May 28, 2006, the Remparts won the 2006 Memorial Cup, the top Canadian Hockey League (CHL) tournament, beating the Moncton Wildcats 6–2 in the finals (although the Remparts were only the runner-up in the 2006 QMJHL championship, they were able to participate in the Memorial Cup since the QMJHL champions were the host city—see Memorial Cup, 1983 to present). Roy is the seventh coach to win the Cup on his rookie year, and the first to do so since Claude Julien with the Hull Olympiques in 1997.

On January 19, 2007, Saguenay Police investigated an incident involving Roy and co-owner of the Chicoutimi Saguenéens, Pierre Cardinal. There were reports that Roy threw punches at the co-owner after he intervened in order to disperse a crowd of hockey fans that were blocking the Remparts' bus after a game between the two clubs. A complaint for assault had been filed against Roy, who faced possible assault charges in the matter. Montreal newspaper Le Journal de Montréal reported that Roy later apologized to the victim via telephone. In a press conference following a Remparts game on January 21, 2007, Roy said that he was "suffering prejudice on the part of the media," and believed that he was not guilty of the incident. He then questioned his future as head coach and co-owner of the team, even considering resigning from his duties. On January 25, 2007, Pierre Cardinal announced that he removed his complaint against Roy, before Roy made a press conference about his future in the Remparts, where he announced he will stay coach and co-owner of the team.

On March 22, 2008, in Chicoutimi, Quebec, Roy was involved in another on-ice incident during Game 2 of a first-round playoff series against the rival Saguenéens. Late in the second period, in which the Saguenéens were leading 7–1, a brawl started and Remparts goaltender Jonathan Roy, Roy's son, charged towards opposing goaltender Bobby Nadeau. Jonathan hit Nadeau numerous times despite Nadeau indicating he did not want to fight. After knocking Nadeau down, Jonathan continued to hit Nadeau. Jonathan then fought a second Saguenéens player before skating off the ice while holding both middle fingers up to the crowd. Roy denied inciting his son Jonathan to fight, despite video evidence showing Roy making a gesture towards his son while he was advancing towards Nadeau. After investigation by the League office, Patrick Roy was suspended for five games and fined $4,000, while his son Jonathan was suspended for seven games and fined $500. The Quebec Ministry of Public Safety has launched a police investigation into the matter. In late July 2008, Jonathan was charged with assault in Saguenay courts.

On November 21, 2008, Roy's other son, Frederick Roy, found trouble playing for the Remparts when he cross-checked an opponent in the head after a stoppage in play. Frederick was ultimately suspended 15 games by the QMJHL for the incident, which occurred the night before Patrick Roy's jersey retirement ceremony in Montreal.

In May 2009, several unnamed sources reported that Roy was offered the head coaching position with the Colorado Avalanche. He turned down the position, but expressed the possibility of becoming an NHL-level coach at some future date.

In September 2012, Roy started a new chapter in his successful career by becoming a permanent member of the French-Canadian hockey talk show l'Antichambre, where he worked as a hockey analyst. He was reunited on the set with his former head coach, Mario Tremblay, the man in part responsible for his departure from Montreal.

NHL coaching career
On May 23, 2013, Roy was named head coach and vice-president of hockey operations of the Colorado Avalanche. TSN's Bob McKenzie reported that Roy would have the final say in all hockey matters. Then-Avalanche General Manager Greg Sherman retained his post, but was considered the general manager "in name only." At the time, Roy was the only coach in the NHL who had the title or powers of General Manager. Before the season started, his former Avs teammate, Joe Sakic, was hired as Executive Vice President of Hockey Operations. Although the title nominally put him above Roy on the organization chart, Roy and Sakic shared most of the duties normally held by a general manager in the NHL–a practice that continued after Sakic was formally granted the title of General Manager in 2014.

Roy's first regular-season game with the Colorado Avalanche as coach was the home opener on October 2, 2013, a 6–1 win over the Anaheim Ducks, where Roy got into a shouting match with Ducks Head Coach Bruce Boudreau and nearly broke the partition separating the two teams' benches. Roy won his first six games as a rookie coach, coincidentally tying Mario Tremblay, his former coach with whom he had a feuding relationship, for the most consecutive wins at the beginning of a NHL coaching career.

In the 2013–14 season, Colorado racked up 112 points, won the Central Division title, tied a franchise record with 52 wins, posted the NHL's best road record (26–11–4) and had zero regulation losses when leading after two periods (35–0–3). For his team's success, Roy won the Jack Adams Award for the NHL's top coach, winning the honour over the Detroit Red Wings' Mike Babcock and the Tampa Bay Lightning's Jon Cooper.

During the 2014 Stanley Cup playoffs, Roy became known for aggressively pulling goaltender Semyon Varlamov to set up a 6-on-5, empty-net scenario, sometimes with as much as three minutes remaining in the game. However, the heavily favoured #2 seed Avalanche ultimately lost in the first round to the #7 seed Minnesota Wild at home in Game 7.

The following season, the Avs regressed significantly, finishing last (seventh) in their division for only the second time in the history of the organization.

On August 11, 2016, Roy, citing a lack of input in personnel decisions, stepped down as the head coach and vice-president of hockey operations for the Avalanche, and was subsequently replaced by Jared Bednar.

Personal life
Patrick Roy married Michèle Piuze on June 9, 1990. They have three children: Jonathan, Frederick and Jana. His sons, Frederick and Jonathan, played for the Quebec Remparts during Roy's tenure as head coach of the team. His son Jonathan has since left hockey to pursue a music career. 

While playing for the Avalanche, Patrick Roy was arrested for domestic violence on October 22, 2000, and was released on $750 bail. Roy and his wife were in an argument, and his wife made a hangup call to 911. Police found physical damage to the house and took Roy into custody. The presiding judge dismissed the case, citing it did not meet the standard for criminal mischief in a case of domestic violence. Roy and Piuze divorced in early 2003; Roy has not remarried.

Since the 1980s, Roy has been a significant contributor to the Ronald McDonald House charity.

Roy was known for superstitious quirks. He often talked to the net posts, and he never talked to reporters on days in which he was scheduled to play. He also refused to let his skates touch the red and blue lines on the ice, stepping over them.

Legacy

In 1989, 1990 and 1992, Roy won the Vezina Trophy as the NHL's best goaltender. He won the Jennings Trophy (fewest goals allowed) in 1987, 1988, 1989 (all shared with Brian Hayward), 1992 and 2002. He led the NHL in shutouts and goals against average twice, was named a First Team All-Star four times, a Second Team All-Star twice and played in 11 National Hockey League All-Star Games. Roy has also won a record three Conn Smythe Trophies as NHL playoff MVP (1986, 1993 and 2001). Among the many goaltending NHL records Roy holds are career playoff games played (247) and career playoff wins (151).

The Avalanche retired Roy's number 33 jersey on October 28, 2003, while the Montreal Canadiens retired Roy's number 33 on November 22, 2008. This makes Roy the sixth NHL player to have his number retired by two organizations. At the news conference announcing Roy's jersey retirement, Roy stated that it was time for him to move on in regards to what happened in 1995, and that he hoped the Canadiens would do the same. Roy was elected to the Hockey Hall of Fame in 2006, his first year of eligibility.

Roy won over 200 games with two franchises (Montreal and Colorado).

Along with Terry Sawchuk, Roy is directly credited with inspiring the jersey numbers that NHL goaltenders use; both are cited as the primary reason goaltenders have come to choose numbers in the 30s since their respective careers.

British Columbia-born baseball player and former American League MVP Justin Morneau wore number 33 in tribute to Roy.

Roy was named one of the "Top 10 Most Superstitious Athletes" by Men's Fitness magazine.

Career statistics

Regular season and playoffs

International

Career coaching statistics

NHL

QMJHL

Career achievements

Milestones
 His jersey number 30 has been retired by the Granby Bisons
 His jersey number 33 has been retired by the Colorado Avalanche and the Montreal Canadiens
 In 1998, he was ranked number 22 on The Hockey News''' list of the 100 Greatest Hockey Players
 The Colorado Sports Hall of Fame 2004
 Quebec Major Junior Hockey League Hall of Fame 2004
 Hockey Hall of Fame inductee 2006
 Was ranked #5 in The Hockey News''' The Top 60 Since 1967 – the best players of the post-expansion era

Records
Most NHL playoff games played by a goaltender (247) (third-most playoff games of all players)
Most NHL playoff wins by a goaltender (151)
First NHL goaltender to play 1,000 NHL games (finished with 1,029 games, later passed by Martin Brodeur)
First NHL goaltender to win 500 games
Most Conn Smythe Trophy wins – 3

Awards

As a player
 
 Calder Cup – 1985
 Stanley Cup – 1986, 1993 (Montreal); 1996, 2001 (Colorado)
 Conn Smythe Trophy – 1986, 1993, 2001
 William M. Jennings Trophy – 1987*, 1988*, 1989*, 1992, 2002
 Vezina Trophy – 1989, 1990, 1992
 NHL All-Star Game – 1988, 1990, 1991, 1992, 1993, 1994, 1997, 1998, 2001, 2002, 2003
 NHL first All-Star team – 1989, 1990, 1992, 2002
 NHL second All-Star team – 1988, 1991
 NHL All-Rookie Team – 1986
 Trico Goaltending Award – 1989, 1990
 The Colorado Avalanche retired Roy's number 33 jersey on October 28, 2003
 The Montreal Canadiens retired Roy's number 33 jersey on November 22, 2008
* Shared with Brian Hayward

As a coach
 Memorial Cup – with Quebec Remparts in 2006
 Jack Adams Award – 2014

See also

List of NHL goaltenders with 300 wins
List of NHL players with 1,000 games played

References

Further reading

External links

 
 Patrick Roy at HockeyGoalies.org – advanced statistics and game logs
 Genealogy : Patrick Roy
 
 
 

1965 births
Canadian expatriate ice hockey players in the United States
Canadian ice hockey coaches
Canadian ice hockey goaltenders
Colorado Avalanche coaches
Colorado Avalanche executives
Colorado Avalanche players
Conn Smythe Trophy winners
French Quebecers
Granby Bisons players
Hockey Hall of Fame inductees
Ice hockey people from Montreal
Ice hockey players at the 1998 Winter Olympics
Jack Adams Award winners
Living people
Montreal Canadiens draft picks
Montreal Canadiens players
National Hockey League All-Stars
National Hockey League players with retired numbers
Olympic ice hockey players of Canada
Quebec Remparts coaches
Sherbrooke Canadiens players
Ice hockey people from Quebec City
Stanley Cup champions
Vezina Trophy winners
William M. Jennings Trophy winners